Nantucket is an island, town and county in Massachusetts.

Nantucket may also refer to:

 Nantucket (CDP), Massachusetts, the main village on the island and in the town
 Nantucket Sound, a section of water along the coast of Massachusetts
 New Nantucket, the former name for Baker Island in the Pacific Ocean
 USS Nantucket, the name of four different US Navy ships
 United States lightship Nantucket (LV-112)
 Nantucket (ship), an 1837 whaleship
 Nantucket Sleighride, the event when a boat from a whaling whip is towed at high speed by a harpooned whale
 Nantucket Sleighride (album), an album and its title song by the hard rock band Mountain
 Nantucket (band), a hard rock band from North Carolina
 Nantucket (album), an album by hard rock band Nantucket
 Nantucket V, an album by hard rock band Nantucket
 The Best Of Nantucket, a compilation album by hard rock band Nantucket
 Nantucket series, a set of alternate history books written by S. M. Stirling.
 Nantucket Nectars, a beverage company
 Nantucket Corporation, the company that developed the programming language Clipper
 "There once was a man from Nantucket", the opening line for many limericks